A logic gate is an idealized or physical device that performs a Boolean function, a logical operation performed on one or more binary inputs that produces a single binary output.

Depending on the context, the term may refer to an ideal logic gate, one that has for instance zero rise time and unlimited fan-out, or it may refer to a non-ideal physical device (see ideal and real op-amps for comparison).

In the real world, the primary way of building logic gates uses diodes or transistors acting as electronic switches. Today, most logic gates are made from MOSFETs (metal–oxide–semiconductor field-effect transistors). They can also be constructed using vacuum tubes, electromagnetic relays with relay logic, fluidic logic, pneumatic logic, optics, molecules, or even mechanical elements.

With amplification, logic gates can be cascaded in the same way that Boolean functions can be composed, allowing the construction of a physical model of all of Boolean logic, and therefore, all of the algorithms and mathematics that can be described with Boolean logic.

Logic circuits include such devices as multiplexers, registers, arithmetic logic units (ALUs), and computer memory, all the way up through complete microprocessors, which may contain more than 100 million logic gates.

Compound logic gates AND-OR-Invert (AOI) and OR-AND-Invert (OAI) are often employed in circuit design because their construction using MOSFETs is simpler and more efficient than the sum of the individual gates.

In reversible logic, Toffoli or Fredkin gates are used.

Electronic gates 

A functionally complete logic system may be composed of relays, valves (vacuum tubes), or transistors. The simplest family of logic gates uses bipolar transistors, and is called resistor–transistor logic (RTL). Unlike simple diode logic gates (which do not have a gain element), RTL gates can be cascaded indefinitely to produce more complex logic functions. RTL gates were used in early integrated circuits. For higher speed and better density, the resistors used in RTL were replaced by diodes resulting in diode–transistor logic (DTL). Transistor–transistor logic (TTL) then supplanted DTL. As integrated circuits became more complex, bipolar transistors were replaced with smaller field-effect transistors (MOSFETs); see PMOS and NMOS. To reduce power consumption still further, most contemporary chip implementations of digital systems now use CMOS logic.  CMOS uses complementary (both n-channel and p-channel) MOSFET devices to achieve a high speed with low power dissipation.

For small-scale logic, designers now use prefabricated logic gates from families of devices such as the TTL 7400 series by Texas Instruments, the CMOS 4000 series by RCA, and their more recent descendants. Increasingly, these fixed-function logic gates are being replaced by programmable logic devices, which allow designers to pack many mixed logic gates into a single integrated circuit. The field-programmable nature of programmable logic devices such as FPGAs has reduced the 'hard' property of hardware; it is now possible to change the logic design of a hardware system by reprogramming some of its components, thus allowing the features or function of a hardware implementation of a logic system to be changed. Other types of logic gates include, but are not limited to:

Electronic logic gates differ significantly from their relay-and-switch equivalents. They are much faster, consume much less power, and are much smaller (all by a factor of a million or more in most cases). Also, there is a fundamental structural difference. The switch circuit creates a continuous metallic path for current to flow (in either direction) between its input and its output. The semiconductor logic gate, on the other hand, acts as a high-gain voltage amplifier, which sinks a tiny current at its input and produces a low-impedance voltage at its output. It is not possible for current to flow between the output and the input of a semiconductor logic gate.

Another important advantage of standardized integrated circuit logic families, such as the 7400 and 4000 families, is that they can be cascaded. This means that the output of one gate can be wired to the inputs of one or several other gates, and so on. Systems with varying degrees of complexity can be built without great concern of the designer for the internal workings of the gates, provided the limitations of each integrated circuit are considered. 

The output of one gate can only drive a finite number of inputs to other gates, a number called the 'fan-out limit'. Also, there is always a delay, called the 'propagation delay', from a change in input of a gate to the corresponding change in its output. When gates are cascaded, the total propagation delay is approximately the sum of the individual delays, an effect which can become a problem in high-speed synchronous circuits. Additional delay can be caused when many inputs are connected to an output, due to the distributed capacitance of all the inputs and wiring and the finite amount of current that each output can provide.

History and development 
The binary number system was refined by Gottfried Wilhelm Leibniz (published in 1705), influenced by the ancient I Chings binary system. Leibniz established that using the binary system combined the principles of arithmetic and logic.

In an 1886 letter, Charles Sanders Peirce described how logical operations could be carried out by electrical switching circuits. Eventually, vacuum tubes replaced relays for logic operations. Lee De Forest's modification, in 1907, of the Fleming valve can be used as a logic gate. Ludwig Wittgenstein introduced a version of the 16-row truth table as proposition 5.101 of Tractatus Logico-Philosophicus (1921). Walther Bothe, inventor of the coincidence circuit, got part of the 1954 Nobel Prize in physics, for the first modern electronic AND gate in 1924. Konrad Zuse designed and built electromechanical logic gates for his computer Z1 (from 1935 to 1938).

From 1934 to 1936, NEC engineer Akira Nakashima, Claude Shannon and Victor Shestakov introduced switching circuit theory in a series of papers showing that two-valued Boolean algebra, which they discovered independently, can describe the operation of switching circuits. Using this property of electrical switches to implement logic is the fundamental concept that underlies all electronic digital computers. Switching circuit theory became the foundation of digital circuit design, as it became widely known in the electrical engineering community during and after World War II, with theoretical rigor superseding the ad hoc methods that had prevailed previously.

Metal–oxide–semiconductor (MOS) devices in the forms of PMOS and NMOS were demonstrated by Bell Labs engineers Mohamed M. Atalla and Dawon Kahng in 1960. Both types were later combined and adapted into complementary MOS (CMOS) logic by Chih-Tang Sah and Frank Wanlass at Fairchild Semiconductor in 1963.

Active research is taking place in molecular logic gates.

Symbols  

There are two sets of symbols for elementary logic gates in common use, both defined in ANSI/IEEE Std 91-1984 and its supplement ANSI/IEEE Std 91a-1991. The "distinctive shape" set, based on traditional schematics, is used for simple drawings and derives from United States Military Standard MIL-STD-806 of the 1950s and 1960s. It is sometimes unofficially described as "military", reflecting its origin. The "rectangular shape" set, based on ANSI Y32.14 and other early industry standards as later refined by IEEE and IEC, has rectangular outlines for all types of gate and allows representation of a much wider range of devices than is possible with the traditional symbols. The IEC standard, IEC 60617-12, has been adopted by other standards, such as EN 60617-12:1999 in Europe, BS EN 60617-12:1999 in the United Kingdom, and DIN EN 60617-12:1998 in Germany.

The mutual goal of IEEE Std 91-1984 and IEC 617-12 was to provide a uniform method of describing the complex logic functions of digital circuits with schematic symbols. These functions were more complex than simple AND and OR gates. They could be medium scale circuits such as a 4-bit counter to a large scale circuit such as a microprocessor.

IEC 617-12 and its renumbered successor IEC 60617-12 do not explicitly show the "distinctive shape" symbols, but do not prohibit them. These are, however, shown in ANSI/IEEE Std 91 (and 91a) with this note: "The distinctive-shape symbol is, according to IEC Publication 617, Part 12, not preferred, but is not considered to be in contradiction to that standard." IEC 60617-12 correspondingly contains the note (Section 2.1) "Although non-preferred, the use of other symbols recognized by official national standards, that is distinctive shapes in place of symbols [list of basic gates], shall not be considered to be in contradiction with this standard. Usage of these other symbols in combination to form complex symbols (for example, use as embedded symbols) is discouraged." This compromise was reached between the respective IEEE and IEC working groups to permit the IEEE and IEC standards to be in mutual compliance with one another.

A third style of symbols, DIN 40700 (1976), was in use in Europe and is still widely used in European academia, see the logic table in German Wikipedia.

In the 1980s, schematics were the predominant method to design both circuit boards and custom ICs known as gate arrays. Today custom ICs and the field-programmable gate array are typically designed with Hardware Description Languages (HDL) such as Verilog or VHDL.

Truth tables 
Output comparison of 1-input logic gates.

Output comparison of 2-input logic gates.

Universal logic gates 

Charles Sanders Peirce (during 1880–1881) showed that NOR gates alone (or alternatively NAND gates alone) can be used to reproduce the functions of all the other logic gates, but his work on it was unpublished until 1933. The first published proof was by Henry M. Sheffer in 1913, so the NAND logical operation is sometimes called Sheffer stroke; the logical NOR is sometimes called Peirce's arrow. Consequently, these gates are sometimes called universal logic gates.

De Morgan equivalent symbols 
By use of De Morgan's laws, an AND function is identical to an OR function with negated inputs and outputs. Likewise, an OR function is identical to an AND function with negated inputs and outputs. A NAND gate is equivalent to an OR gate with negated inputs, and a NOR gate is equivalent to an AND gate with negated inputs.

This leads to an alternative set of symbols for basic gates that use the opposite core symbol (AND or OR) but with the inputs and outputs negated. Use of these alternative symbols can make logic circuit diagrams much clearer and help to show accidental connection of an active high output to an active low input or vice versa. Any connection that has logic negations at both ends can be replaced by a negationless connection and a suitable change of gate or vice versa. Any connection that has a negation at one end and no negation at the other can be made easier to interpret by instead using the De Morgan equivalent symbol at either of the two ends. When negation or polarity indicators on both ends of a connection match, there is no logic negation in that path (effectively, bubbles "cancel"), making it easier to follow logic states from one symbol to the next. This is commonly seen in real logic diagrams – thus the reader must not get into the habit of associating the shapes exclusively as OR or AND shapes, but also take into account the bubbles at both inputs and outputs in order to determine the "true" logic function indicated.

A De Morgan symbol can show more clearly a gate's primary logical purpose and the polarity of its nodes that are considered in the "signaled" (active, on) state. Consider the simplified case where a two-input NAND gate is used to drive a motor when either of its inputs are brought low by a switch. The "signaled" state (motor on) occurs when either one OR the other switch is on. Unlike a regular NAND symbol, which suggests AND logic, the De Morgan version, a two negative-input OR gate, correctly shows that OR is of interest. The regular NAND symbol has a bubble at the output and none at the inputs (the opposite of the states that will turn the motor on), but the De Morgan symbol shows both inputs and output in the polarity that will drive the motor.

De Morgan's theorem is most commonly used to implement logic gates as combinations of only NAND gates, or as combinations of only NOR gates, for economic reasons.

Data storage and sequential logic 

Logic gates can also be used to hold a state, allowing data storage. A storage element can be constructed by connecting several gates in a "latch" circuit. Latching circuitry is used in static random-access memory. More complicated designs that use clock signals and that change only on a rising or falling edge of the clock are called edge-triggered "flip-flops". Formally, a flip-flop is called a bistable circuit, because it has two stable states which it can maintain indefinitely. The combination of multiple flip-flops in parallel, to store a multiple-bit value, is known as a register. When using any of these gate setups the overall system has memory; it is then called a sequential logic system since its output can be influenced by its previous state(s), i.e. by the sequence of input states.  In contrast, the output from combinational logic is purely a combination of its present inputs, unaffected by the previous input and output states.

These logic circuits are used in computer memory. They vary in performance, based on factors of speed, complexity, and reliability of storage, and many different types of designs are used based on the application.

Three-state logic gates 

A three-state logic gate is a type of logic gate that can have three different outputs: high (H), low (L) and high-impedance (Z). The high-impedance state plays no role in the logic, which is strictly binary. These devices are used on buses of the CPU to allow multiple chips to send data. A group of three-states driving a line with a suitable control circuit is basically equivalent to a multiplexer, which may be physically distributed over separate devices or plug-in cards.

In electronics, a high output would mean the output is sourcing current from the positive power terminal (positive voltage). A low output would mean the output is sinking current to the negative power terminal (zero voltage). High impedance would mean that the output is effectively disconnected from the circuit.

Manufacturing 

Since the 1990s, most logic gates are made in CMOS (complementary metal oxide semiconductor) technology that uses both NMOS and PMOS transistors. Often millions of logic gates are packaged in a single integrated circuit.

Non-electronic logic gates 
Non-electronic implementations are varied, though few of them are used in practical applications. Many early electromechanical digital computers, such as the Harvard Mark I, were built from relay logic gates, using electro-mechanical relays. Logic gates can be made using pneumatic devices, such as the Sorteberg relay or mechanical logic gates, including on a molecular scale. Various types of fundamental logic gates have been constructed using molecules (molecular logic gates), which are based on chemical inputs and spectroscopic outputs. Logic gates have been made out of DNA (see DNA nanotechnology) and used to create a computer called MAYA (see MAYA-II). Logic gates can be made from quantum mechanical effects, see quantum logic gate. Photonic logic gates use nonlinear optical effects.

In principle any method that leads to a gate that is functionally complete (for example, either a NOR or a NAND gate) can be used to make any kind of digital logic circuit. Note that the use of 3-state logic for bus systems is not needed, and can be replaced by digital multiplexers, which can be built using only simple logic gates (such as NAND gates, NOR gates, or AND and OR gates).

Logic families 
There are several logic families with different characteristics (power consumption, speed, cost, size) such as: RDL (resistor–diode logic), RTL (resistor-transistor logic), DTL (diode–transistor logic), TTL (transistor–transistor logic) and CMOS. There are also sub-variants, e.g. standard CMOS logic vs. advanced types using still CMOS technology, but with some optimizations for avoiding loss of speed due to slower PMOS transistors.

See also 

 And-inverter graph
 Boolean algebra topics
 Boolean function
 Digital circuit
 Espresso heuristic logic minimizer
 Fan-out
 Field-programmable gate array (FPGA)
 Flip-flop (electronics)
 Functional completeness
 Karnaugh map
 Combinational logic
 List of 4000 series integrated circuits
 List of 7400 series integrated circuits
 Logic family
 Logic level
 Logical graph
 NMOS logic
 Processor design
 Programmable logic controller (PLC)
 Programmable Logic Device (PLD)
 Propositional calculus
 Quantum logic gate
 Race hazard
 Reversible computing
 Truth table

References

Further reading

External links
 

 
Charles Sanders Peirce